The "Cornbread mafia" was the name for a group of Kentucky men who created the largest domestic marijuana production operation in United States history. It was based in Marion, Nelson and Washington counties in central Kentucky. The term "Cornbread Mafia" was first used in public by federal prosecutors in a June 1989 press conference, where  they revealed that 70 men had been arrested for organizing a marijuana trafficking ring that stretched across 30 farms in 10 states stretching from the Southeast into the Midwest. The story was first reported in the Courier Journal Magazine in Louisville, Kentucky on October 8, 1989 and then in 2012 in the narrative non-fiction book, The Cornbread Mafia: A Homegrown Syndicate's Code Of Silence And The Biggest Marijuana Bust In American History (2012), by James Higdon.    

In his two books,The Origins Of The Cornbread Mafia, A Memoir of Sorts (2016) and Cornbread Mafia The Outlaws of Central Kentucky (2018) author and founding member Joe Keith Bickett, chronicles his first-hand account as to how the term "Cornbread Mafia" was coined in Kentucky in the late 1970s. and the groups ultimate downfall in the late 1980s. 

Bickett wrote his memoirs "The Origins of the Cornbread Mafia, A Memoir of Sorts" and "Cornbread Mafia, The Outlaws of Central Kentucky" while incarcerated in the 1990s but did not publish his books until several years after his release from federal prison in 2011

Origin of the name

Higdon's book reports that assistant US Attorney Cleve Gambill said at the June 1989 press conference: "The organization is a highly motivated, well financed group of marijuana growers from Kentucky who are responsible for growing this vast amount of marijuana [and who] call themselves the Cornbread Mafia.". Prosecutors held this press conference to lay out their case against the "Cornbread Mafia" because of the 70 men arrested in association with it, zero of them cooperated with authorities, which thwarted a Continuing Criminal Enterprise case against the suspected ringleaders. Internal documents describe the proposed CCE prosecution as "futile" because of the group's collective silence. 

This code of silence persisted until Higdon published his book, The Cornbread Mafia, in 2012. Joe Keith Bickett was released from prison in 2011 after serving approximately 21 years of his 25 year sentence. In 2016, Joe Keith Bickett self-published a first-hand account in his 2016 memoir titled "The Origins of the Cornbread Mafia: A Memoir of Sorts", in which he provides a first-hand account how the term Cornbread Mafia was actually coined in September 1978.

Allegations

Between 1985 and 1989, 70 Kentuckians were accused of growing 182 tons of marijuana on 29 farms in 10 states, including Minnesota, Illinois, Indiana, Michigan, Nebraska, Missouri and Kansas, which federal prosecutors considered to be the "largest domestic marijuana producing organization in the nation." By the end of 1991, prosecutors had arrested more than 100 members of the Cornbread Mafia, mostly from Lebanon, Kentucky.  

According to Joe Keith Bickett's second book, Bobby Joe "Redeye" Shewmaker,the leader of the Kansas crew, was the only defendant in the group's history to be indicted on a CCE charge (Career Criminal Enterprise). Jimmy Bickett and author Joe Keith Bickett, along with two codefendants, were the only defendants who proceeded to a jury trial after being indicted in March 1989 in federal court in Louisville, Kentucky on distribution of marijuana charges. The cornbread mafia has been brought up in the Summer Wells disappearance case.

Johnny Boone

The most notable member of the Cornbread Mafia was Johnny Boone, arrested in 1987 as the ringleader of a marijuana operation in Minnesota, for which he served about 15 years in prison. In June 2008, police discovered Boone growing 2,421 marijuana seedlings on his farm outside Springfield, Kentucky in Washington County, but Boone escaped arrest, under threat of a life sentence without parole because the bust would be his third federal conviction under the Three Strikes Law. Boone became a fugitive and the subject of a segment of America's Most Wanted. 

On Dec. 22, 2016, after eight years on the run, Johnny Boone was arrested in a small town outside Montreal, where he had been tracked by the U.S. Marshals Service. He was brought to the United States in April 2017. On December 19, 2017, Boone pled guilty to one count of a superseding information.  Boone was represented by attorneys C.Thomas Hectus, Henry Stephens and Elmer J. George. Author, Joe Keith Bickett was employed as law clerk/paralegal for Mr. George and worked as a legal aid for the attorneys on the Johnny Boone case.  Contrary to the life sentences he was facing, Boone was sentenced to fifty-seven months by Chief District Court Judge, Charles Simpson, III, the same judge who sentenced the Bickett brothers, Jimmy and Joe Keith, in 1990.

Boone was sentenced to serve his time at FCI Elkton, a low security federal prison in Ohio. In the midst of the COVID-19 coronavirus pandemic, the Elkton prison became notorious for being overrun with the disease. Due to health risks, Boone's attorneys requested in May 2020 he be released; which was granted on June 3.

Obama clemency

President Barack Obama granted clemency to three men from Marion County, Kentucky; all were either directly or indirectly connected to the Cornbread Mafia.

In November 2011, President Obama granted a pardon to Les Berry, an original member of the alleged "Cornbread Mafia," who was caught in Wisconsin driving a get-away car with six other Kentucky men fleeing a marijuana farm in Minnesota in late October 1987.

In March 2015, President Obama commuted the prison sentences of 22 drug offenders, including Francis Darrell Hayden, a Marion County native. Hayden had been serving a life prison sentence for marijuana cultivation because he was convicted three times for illegal cultivation, triggering the Three-strikes law. His last bust was in Michigan in 1998 for growing nearly 19,000 marijuana plants, after similar busts in 1980 and 1990.

In December 2016, President Obama granted clemency to an additional 231 incarcerated people, including another man from Marion County: Aaron Glasscock. Glasscock was arrested as a college student in the late 1990s as part of a drug trafficking ring operated by his father. In 2000, he was sentenced to 30 years in prison, just two months shy of his pre-med degree. Glasscock's commutation was announced just a few days before Johnny Boone was captured in Canada.

In January 2017, Higdon reported on these Obama clemencies of Cornbread men for Politico, suggesting that Obama could pardon Johnny Boone before he left office in "The Big Statement Obama Could Make on Legalizing Pot."

Cornbread Mafia in media and popular culture

For much of the 1980s, the Cornbread Mafia was reported upon by photojournalist Steve Lowery of the Lebanon Enterprise, many of whose photographs are in Higdon's book.

By 2007, the term "Cornbread Mafia" had come to mean general Southern-style corruption. There is also a song by Molly Hatchet called Cornbread Mafia (on the Kingdom of XII album), and a now-defunct band that called itself Cornbread Mafia.

In a 2015 interview with Terry Gross, Graham Yost, the creator and show runner of the FX series Justified, said, "Honestly, we didn't know a lot about the Dixie Mafia. It also goes by the name The Cornbread Mafia. But we, you know, started poking around. Frankly, probably, we started with reading Wikipedia like anyone else..."

A series of unsolved murders in Bardstown, Kentucky have been incorrectly attributed to the Cornbread Mafia.

In 2016 Texas singer/songwriter, Cody Jinks produced and released his album "Black Sheep" which featured a song about Johnny Boone simply titled "Johnny." 
In April 2018, Nashville recording artist, Sweepy Walker, the grandson of beloved Grand Ole Opry legend Billy Walker released "Cornbread Mafia" - a feel-good, good-time bar song about local legends John Boone "them Bickett boys, and too many more to mention.

In June 2018, singer/songwriter Tyler Childers held a benefit concert for Johnny Boone at Gravely Brewery in Louisville, telling an interviewer from the Louisville Eccentric Observer: "I read the book [‘Cornbread Mafia’] that Jim Higdon came out with, and I got some friends from over my way that were friends with Johnny — people that I hold in high regard, and people that hold him in high regard. I figured that I would try to help in some way.”

Legal cannabis

A cannabis breeder in Colorado has created a strain of marijuana called Cornbread.

In 2018, Bickett and Boone, a CBD company based in Marion County became the first CBD company to produce hemp to make CBD products grown by original members of the Cornbread Mafia. Bickett and Boone not only sells CBD products but also grows the hemp to make their products on their family farms near Raywick, Kentucky  which is primarily grown by original members of the Cornbread Mafia.  Bickett and Boone CBD products are the only CBD products endorsed by the original members of the Cornbread Mafia, including Joe Keith Bickett and Johnny Boone. Their products are sold nation-wide and on their website, Bickett and Boone.com.  Bickett and Boone prides themselves in producing a CBD product from "seed to seal."

In 2019, Cornbread Mafia book author James Higdon co-founded Cornbread Hemp, which sells  CBD (cannabidiol) products in retail outlets in the United States. Cornbread Hemp was featured in the November 2019 print edition of High Times magazine. In January 2020, Cornbread Hemp became the first brand from Kentucky to offer USDA certified organic CBD products. In May 2020, Higdon was featured in a Q&A with Forbes contributor Warren Bobrow, the Cocktail Whisperer; and Cornbread Hemp products were featured in Whole Foods Magazine.

Further reading
 
 Bickett, Joe Keith [[Cornbread Mafia The Outlaws Of Central Kentucky]],

See also
Dixie Mafia
Cowboy Mafia

References

Organized crime groups in the United States
Gangs in Kentucky
Drug rings
American cannabis traffickers
Cannabis in Kentucky
Cannabis in Illinois
Cannabis in Indiana